Darren Christie Melusi (born 21 November 1984) is Swazi footballer. He plays for Mbabane Swallows in the Swazi Premier League. He is a member of Swaziland national football team, played at the 2012 Africa Cup of Nations qualification, scored one goal.

References

External links 
 

1984 births
Living people
People from Mbabane
Swazi footballers
Swazi expatriate footballers
Eswatini international footballers
Association football forwards
Association football midfielders
Delaware Fightin' Blue Hens men's soccer players
Expatriate soccer players in the United States
Mbabane Swallows players
Swazi expatriate sportspeople in the United States